Warren County Courthouse and Circuit Court Building were two historic government buildings and a national historic district located at Warrenton, Warren County, Missouri.  They were two brick hipped roofed buildings.  The courthouse was built between 1869 and 1871 and was a two-story, Classical Revival style building.  It had a symmetrical plan, cast-iron columns, rounded-arch windows, recessed arch entrance doors, and cupola. The Circuit Court Building was built in 1866 and was a two-story building with iron shutters.  The buildings have been demolished.

It was listed on the National Register of Historic Places in 1972.

References

County courthouses in Missouri
Historic districts on the National Register of Historic Places in Missouri
Courthouses on the National Register of Historic Places in Missouri
Neoclassical architecture in Missouri
Government buildings completed in 1871
Buildings and structures in Warren County, Missouri
National Register of Historic Places in Warren County, Missouri